Pony Club is an international youth organization devoted to educating youth about horses and riding. Pony Club organizations exist in over thirty countries worldwide.

Origins
Pony Club began in Great Britain in 1929 when the Institute of the Horse formed a youth branch of their organisation called "The Pony Club." It was formed to encourage children to start riding, while providing them with opportunities in the field that they would not be able to reach on their own. The group grew rapidly, from 300 members in 1930, to over 10,000 in 1935. When the Institute of the Horse joined with National Horse Association of Great Britain to form The British Horse Society, Pony Club was incorporated into the new group.

The success of Pony Club in Britain sparked the formation of Pony Clubs in other nations, such that there are now over 100,000 Pony Club members worldwide. Australia has the largest pony club membership in the world with just under 55,000 financial members. Note they also ride horses.

Structure
Each national Pony Club organization has the ability to define its own structure. There is no strict international governing body; however, national Pony Club organizations often work together for international competitions and exchanges.

The core unit of any national Pony Club organization is the local club. Local clubs vary in size, but are generally confined to members within a relatively small geographic area. Multiple local clubs may conduct joint mounted and unmounted meetings, and usually compete together in regional competitions.

Ages of participants range from eight to twenty-five. Because of this vast age range, older Pony Clubbers are able to provide assistance to younger members, and younger members are able to be mentored.

The Pony Club's internal structure consists of many ability levels - from the Beginner: D1, D2, and D3, to the Intermediate: C1, C2, and C3, followed by the Advanced: HB, B, HA, and A.

Further structuring is dependent upon the particular national organization, but most local clubs belong to regions, in which they compete to qualify for national and international competitions.

Manuals
Pony Club manuals are books which provide all the information needed to earn certificates and achievement badges. They have a range of useful information from buying a horse to looking after it and competing with it. They teach Pony Club members horsemanship, how to care for their horses and the responsibilities and positive outcomes of owning a horse.

See also
New Zealand Pony Clubs Association
Pony Club Australia
The Pony Club
United States Pony Clubs

References

The Pony Club Manual of Horsemanship.(13th Edition, 2004)

External links
Canada: Canadian Pony Club
Republic of Ireland: Irish Pony Club 
Europe: Euro Pony Club
China: Hong Kong Pony Club
United States of America: Pony Club
Pony Club Australia

Equestrian organizations
Youth organizations established in 1929